German submarine U-63 was a Type IIC U-boat of Nazi Germany's Kriegsmarine that served in the Second World War. She was built by Deutsche Werke AG, Kiel. Ordered on 21 July 1937, she was laid down on 2 January 1939 as yard number 262. She was launched on 6 December 1939 and commissioned on 18 January 1940 under the command of Oberleutnant zur See Günther Lorentz.

U-63 was initially assigned to the 1st U-boat Flotilla during her training period, until 1 February 1940. She stayed with that organization until her sinking.

Design
German Type IIC submarines were enlarged versions of the original Type IIs. U-63 had a displacement of  when at the surface and  while submerged. She had two shafts and two  propellers.

U-63 was fitted with three  torpedo tubes at the bow, five torpedoes or up to twelve Type A torpedo mines, and a  anti-aircraft gun. The boat had a complement of 25.

Patrol
U-63 left the German island of Helgoland (also known as 'Heligoland'), on 17 February 1940. It took place in the vicinity of the Orkney and Shetland Islands between 18 and 20 February.

The boat sank the Santos off Kirkwall, Orkney, on 24 February 1940.

Fate

One man died, there were 24 survivors. Those who survived spent the remainder of the war as POWs.

Summary of raiding history

References

Bibliography

External links
 
 

German Type II submarines
U-boats commissioned in 1940
U-boats sunk in 1940
World War II submarines of Germany
U-boats sunk by British submarines
U-boats sunk by depth charges
U-boats sunk by British warships
1939 ships
World War II shipwrecks in the North Sea
Ships built in Kiel
Maritime incidents in February 1940